The broadcasts of the Olympic Games produced by Nine's Wide World of Sports is televised on Nine Network and Stan Sport in Australia. The network's last Olympics broadcast was the 2012 Summer Games in London, United Kingdom.

History
On 13 October 2007, the International Olympic Committee announced that the Nine Network, in joint partnership with subscription television provider Foxtel, secured broadcasting rights for the 2010 Winter Olympics and the 2012 Summer Olympics in Australia.

On 7 February 2023, Nine was announced the exclusive Australian broadcaster for Paris 2024, Milan-Cortina 2026, Los Angeles 2028,  Winter Olympics 2030 and Brisbane 2032 in a deal worth $305AUD.

Broadcast rights history

Staff and Commentators

2012 London Olympics
Various Nine programs including Today, Mornings, Millionaire Hot Seat, The Footy Show, 60 Minutes and Australia's Funniest Home Videos went on hiatus during Nine's broadcast of the 2012 London Olympics. A daily highlights package London Gold aired at 9am weekdays following the live overnight coverage.
 Eddie McGuire
 Ken Sutcliffe
 Giaan Rooney
 James Brayshaw
 Mark Nicholas
 Ray Warren
 Garry Lyon
 Karl Stefanovic
 Leila McKinnon
 James Tomkins
 Kerri Pottharst
 Scott McGrory
 Debbie Watson
 Melinda Gainsford-Taylor
 Michael Slater
 Andrew Gaze
 Andrew Voss
 Grant Hackett
 Jane Flemming
 Cameron Williams
 Tim Sherridan
 Phil Liggett
 Tim Gilbert
 Simon O'Donnell
 Billy Brownless
 Tony Jones
 Peter Donegan
 Michael Thomson
 Daley Thompson
 Steve Ovett

See also
Olympics on Seven
Olympics on Ten
Olympics on Australian television
Australia at the Olympics

References

Olympics on Australian television
2010s Australian television series
Nine's Wide World of Sport
Australia at the Olympics